Orlando Ricardo Menes is a Cuban-American poet, short story writer, translator, editor, and professor.

Born in Lima, Peru, to Cuban parents, Menes immigrated to the United States at the age of 10 after a leftist coup d'etat forced his family out of Peru. He has lived almost his entire life in the US, except for two years spent in Madrid, Spain, right before the death of Francisco Franco.

Career
Menes earned a BA and a MA from the University of Florida and a PhD in English from the University of Illinois at Chicago. He currently teaches in the Creative Writing Program at the University of Notre Dame.

The author of seven poetry collections, apart from anthologies and numerous translations of Latin American poetry, Menes's work has appeared in Poetry, Ploughshares, The Antioch Review, Prairie Schooner, Hudson Review, Yale Review, Harvard Review, Callaloo, Hotel Amerika, Boulevard, Shenandoah, The Southern Review, Sycamore Review, Indiana Review, River Styx, Epoch, Colorado Review, New Letters, Crab Orchard Review, and Green Mountains Review.

Awards
2009 Literature Fellowship from the National Endowment for the Arts
2012 Prairie Schooner Book Prize (Poetry), Fetish
2019 Glenna Luschei Prairie Schooner Award in Fiction

Works

Books
 The Gospel of Wildflowers & Weeds (University of New Mexico Press, 2022)
 Memoria (Louisiana State University Press, 2019)
 Heresies (University of New Mexico Press, 2015)
 Fetish (University of Nebraska, 2013)
 Furia (Milkweed Editions, 2005)
 Rumba atop the Stones (Peepal Tree Press, 2001)
 Borderlands with Angels (chapbook) [Bacchae Press, 1994].  Winner of the 1994 Bacchae Press Chapbook Contest.

Anthologies
 The Open Light: Poets from Notre Dame, 1991–2008 (University of Notre Dame Press, 2011)
 Renaming Ecstasy: Latino Writings on the Sacred (Bilingual Press/Editorial Bilingüe, 2004)

Translations
 My Heart Flooded with Water: Selected Poems by Alfonsina Storni (Latin American Literary Review Press, 2009)

External links
 Author website
 Faculty website
 Poetry Foundation
 Academy of American Poets

References 

American male poets
American writers of Cuban descent
Hispanic and Latino American poets
Living people
University of Florida alumni
University of Illinois Chicago alumni
University of Notre Dame faculty
Poets from Illinois
Poets from Indiana
Year of birth missing (living people)
20th-century American poets
20th-century American male writers
21st-century American poets
21st-century American male writers
Poets from Florida